The first of the passenger railway stations in Cornwall, United Kingdom, were opened in 1834. The network expanded considerably between the 1840s and 1900s. There were 81 stations in the duchy in 1960 but rationalisation of lines and stations has reduced this to just 36 National rail stations since 1989 including two opened in the 1970s. There are also a small number of new or reopened stations on heritage railways.

Railway development in Cornwall

Early transport in Cornwall relied on coastal shipping so the first rail tracks were laid to connect the hinterland with harbours. The first line to carry passengers was the Bodmin and Wadebridge Railway (B&WR) on 4 July 1834.

The CR completed its line from Truro to Falmouth on 24 August 1863. The WCR and CR were financially supported by the Great Western Railway (GWR). The GWR network was completed in 1905 by a long line which connected Truro with Newquay via .

Meanwhile the B&WR had been bought by the London and South Western Railway (LSWR) but remained isolated from its parent until their line through the north of Cornwall to  opened in 1895. This was extended to Padstow in 1899. The LSWR became part of the Southern Railway in 1923 while the GWR continued with its same name, although absorbing the last of the still independent lines that it operated.

The 1900s saw a number of small halts opened and, often, closed as the railways made an effort to keep local traffic away from trams and buses. The railways themselves operated bus routes, the first in the country being a GWR service from Helston railway station to The Lizard in 1903.

During the 1960s many of the quieter stations and lines were closed, either as a result of Dr Beeching's Reshaping of British Railways or general commercial considerations. The whole of the LSWR network was closed (except for two stations on a truncated Callington line) as were many GWR branches, but this has allowed heritage and narrow gauge railways to open using parts of these old lines.

Stations on the national network
Estimated station usage based on sales of tickets in stated financial year(s) which end or originate at each station from Office of Rail and Road statistics. The methodology for calculating the number may vary between years. Closure dates refer to passenger services, goods traffic may have continued to a later date.

Heritage railway stations

Stations in use

References

Railway stations
Cornwall
Rail transport in Cornwall